The Swansea Building Society,, is an independent mutual building society based in Swansea, Wales. It is a member of the Building Societies Association.

The Society was founded in 1923 by local estate agent John Oliver Watkins  and a group of local business men as a mutual organisation to allow purchases of new homes in the aftermath of the First World War. Today it is one of only three remaining building societies based in Wales and the only building society or bank with its headquarters in Wales west of Cardiff. At 31 December 2021, the Society's total assets were £463.5m with some 21,170 saver accounts and over 2,120 mortgage accounts. The chief executive is Alun Williams.

Swansea Building Society benefited from the Icelandic financial crisis in 2009, as local savers looked to invest in a safer institution. The Society has since continued to grow by opening three branches in  Carmarthen, Cowbridge and Mumbles in recent years, with all branches providing bi-lingual services for members. In 2021 it established an additional presence in Abergavenny to extend its geographic reach and provide a base upon which to establish an additional branch.  In 2019, it relocated its main branch to Portland Street in Swansea city centre, retaining and  refurbishing its previous premises to host its expanding Head Office functions.

The Society remains entirely mutual and independent in its outlook, relying only on funding from its Members through savings accounts and not using any retail funding or HM Treasury funding subsidies. It provides a personalised and face-to-face mortgage service for its existing and potential Members rather than using any automated vetting or screening. This approach delivers flexible solutions for potential borrowers and very safe lending for the Society.  As a result, Society mortgage provisions remain low, amounting to only 0.14%  (cf. 0.23% as the industry sector average published for the end of 2020) and payment arrears of only £38k, i.e. 0.32% (cf. 0.78% as the peer average at the end of 2021).

During 2020, the Society successfully launched its online savings product, together with automated transfers for its savers to manage their savers accounts with the Society alongside their clearing bank accounts. This enables easy transfers from current account in one to higher rate savings accounts in the other, thus gaining the best of both financial solutions. The full range of Society products is available at exactly the same rates - either through branches or online - or more importantly to both current Members and new Members alike.

In May 2010, the Society launched a savings account in partnership with Swansea City A.F.C., earning the club additional revenue through commission. The Society is now a sponsor for Swansea City A.F.C. and retains its close links with its community and local charities.  In February 2022, the Society introduced a new set of "Green" mortgages to encourage new or existing members to improve the energy efficiency of their properties.

References

External links
 

Building societies of Wales
Banks established in 1923
Organizations established in 1923
Companies based in Swansea
1923 establishments in Wales